Hawthorne is an unincorporated community in Montgomery County, Iowa, United States.

History
Hawthorne's population was 71 in 1902, and 40 in 1925.

Notable person
Clyde Cessna (1879-1954), aviator and businessman, was born in Hawthorne.

Notes

Unincorporated communities in Montgomery County, Iowa
Unincorporated communities in Iowa